The men's mass start at the 2017 Asian Winter Games was held on 23 February 2017 in Obihiro, Japan.

Schedule
All times are Japan Standard Time (UTC+09:00)

Results
Legend
DNF — Did not finish
DSQ — Disqualified

References

External links
Results

Men mass start